Olga Zimina (born 14 May 1982 in Vladimir, Russia) is a Russian-born Italian chess player. She holds the titles of woman grandmaster, and international master. She won the Women's Russian Chess Championship in 2001, and qualified for the Women's World Chess Championship 2016 (knock-out) as the winner of a zonal.

External links 

Italian female chess players
Living people
1982 births
Chess woman grandmasters
Sportspeople from Vladimir Oblast
People from Vladimir, Russia